Colliston is a roadside hamlet in Angus, Scotland that is four miles north of Arbroath on the A933 Arbroath to Brechin road, in the parish of St Vigeans.

See also
Arbroath

References

Sources
Colliston in the Gazetteer for Scotland.

Villages in Angus, Scotland